Barbara Lawrence (born July 17, 1934) is an American former politician who served as a Republican in the Kansas House of Representatives and Kansas State Senate.

Lawrence was born in Emporia, Kansas and resided in Wichita, Kansas as an adult. She was elected to the Kansas House in 1988 and re-elected in 1990; in 1992, she ascended to the Kansas Senate and served two terms there, winning re-election in 1996. During her last term in the Kansas House, she worked with fellow representative Susan Wagle on legislation that would lower property taxes; however, the bill failed to advance. In addition to her state legislature service, Lawrence also worked as a schoolteacher.

References

1934 births
Living people
Republican Party Kansas state senators
Republican Party members of the Kansas House of Representatives
Politicians from Wichita, Kansas
20th-century American politicians
Women state legislators in Kansas
20th-century American women politicians